Strikeforce: Payback was a mixed martial arts event held on October 3, 2008.  The event was produced by Strikeforce and took place at the Broomfield Events Center in Broomfield, Colorado.  It marks the first time Strikeforce has held an event in Colorado and the main event featured a rematch between Duane Ludwig and Sammy Morgan.

Background
Pat Barry was set to face Andre Walker at the event but instead signed a contract with the Ultimate Fighting Championship and was replaced by Carlos Zevallos in the bout.

Results

See also 
 Strikeforce (mixed martial arts)
 List of Strikeforce champions
 List of Strikeforce events
 2008 in Strikeforce

References

Payback
2008 in mixed martial arts
Mixed martial arts in Colorado
Sports in Broomfield, Colorado
2008 in Colorado